Court Street was a former Rochester Industrial and Rapid Transit Railway station located in Rochester, New York. It was closed in 1956 along with the rest of the line.

The remains of the station were located in a cutting that had once been the bed of the Erie Canal, immediately south of the mouth of the tunnel under Court Street on the west side of South Avenue. This site is adjacent to the historic Lehigh Valley Railroad Station building and south of the Rundel Memorial Library. Above the station was a former access road that went from Court Street to the Lehigh Valley Railroad yard that was mostly demolished in the 1960s. Alongside the station was the Johnson and Seymour Millrace. Just past the station was an elevated loop intended to connect to a streetcar line on South Avenue. There was also an electrified connection to the Lehigh Valley Railroad. The station site was destroyed in 2017 when the City of Rochester began redevelopment of the site in preparation for a luxury highrise.

References

Railway stations in Rochester, New York
Railway stations in the United States opened in 1918
Railway stations closed in 1956
1918 establishments in New York (state)
1956 disestablishments in New York (state)